Kobyay is a rural locality (a selo) and the administrative center of Kobyaysky Rural Okrug of Kobyaysky District in the Sakha Republic, Russia, located  from Sangar, the administrative center of the district. and  north west of Yakutsk, the capital of the Republic Its population as of the 2002 Census was 2,570.

References

Notes

Sources
Official website of the Sakha Republic. Registry of the Administrative-Territorial Divisions of the Sakha Republic. Kobyaysky District. 

Rural localities in Kobyaysky District